Look Out Machines! is a studio album by Northern Irish recording artist Duke Special. It was released on 6 April 2015 by Stranger Records Ltd.

Track listing

References

2015 albums
Duke Special albums
Pop rock albums by artists from Northern Ireland